Vladimir Yereshchenko (born 7 September 1962) is a Russian boxer. He competed in the men's welterweight event at the 1988 Summer Olympics.

References

1962 births
Living people
Russian male boxers
Olympic boxers of the Soviet Union
Boxers at the 1988 Summer Olympics
Sportspeople from Voronezh
AIBA World Boxing Championships medalists
Welterweight boxers